Jason Soules (born March 14, 1971) is a Canadian former professional ice hockey defenceman.  He was drafted in the first round, 15th overall, by the Edmonton Oilers in the 1989 NHL Entry Draft.  He never played in the National Hockey League, however. He currently runs a hockey training establishment in Hamilton, Ontario.

Career statistics

External links

1971 births
Belleville Bulls players
Canadian ice hockey defencemen
Cape Breton Oilers players
Edmonton Oilers draft picks
Hamilton Dukes players
Hamilton Steelhawks players
Ice hockey people from Ontario
Sportspeople from Hamilton, Ontario
Living people
National Hockey League first-round draft picks
Niagara Falls Thunder players